The Cripple Creek & Victor Narrow Gauge Railroad (CC&VNG RR) is a  narrow-gauge heritage railroad that operates seasonal tourist trains between Cripple Creek and the city's outskirts to the south.  The railroad uses a revitalized section of the original Midland Terminal Railway and the Florence and Cripple Creek Railroad.  The railroad's one station and around half of its route is located within the Cripple Creek Historic District, a National Historic Landmark.

Rolling stock 
As of the 2017 season, the railroad operates three coal-fired narrow-gauge steam locomotives. Engine #1 is an  Orenstein & Koppel articulated mallet built in 1902. Engine #2 is a  Henschel built in 1936. Engine #3 is an  H. K. Porter tank built in 1927. Engine #4 is a W. G. Bagnall , built in 1947 which is under long term overhaul. The 5th engine is a 1951 General Electric,  engine that was battery operated for underground mining at the Idarado Mine near Telluride, Colorado. The engine is currently being used by the railroad's track crew.

Former Lisbon streetcars 762 and 776, in  track gauge, were acquired in 2003 for local operation but remained both mothballed — respectively in a private driveway north of Cripple Creek and in a lot in downtown Victor.

Rail gauges
The current railroad started operations on June 28, 1967.

Track route
The track system begins at Bennett Avenue/5th Street going south out of Cripple Creek, goes past the old Midland Terminal Wye, then over a reconstructed train trestle, continues past historic mines and  terminates very near the abandoned Anaconda mining camp. The railroad does not actually terminate at Victor, Colorado, as the railroad's name implies.

Stations and depot
The Bull Hill Station, in Cripple Creek was originally built at the Anaconda Mine in 1894 by the Midland Terminal Railway. However, it was moved to Bull Hill in 1912, east of the town of Victor. In 1968, the depot was moved to Cripple Creek.

See also

List of Colorado historic railroads
List of heritage railroads in the United States

References

External links

Cripple Creek & Victor Narrow Gauge Railroad Official Site
Map of the Colorado Springs and Cripple Creek District Railway at the Old Colorado City Historical Society
Cripple Creek & Victor Narrow Gauge Railroad Photos

Heritage railroads in Colorado
2 ft gauge railways in the United States
Narrow gauge railroads in Colorado
Transportation in Teller County, Colorado
Tourist attractions in Teller County, Colorado